Water fern is a common name for several plants and may refer to:
 Salviniales, an order of aquatic ferns
 Austroblechnum lanceolatum, syn. Blechnum chambersii, lance water fern
 Austroblechnum patersonii, syn. Blechnum patersonii, or strap water fern
 Austroblechnum penna-marina, syn. Blechnum penna-marina, or alpine water fern
 Azolla filiculoides
 Bolbitis heudelotii, or African water fern
 Cranfillia fluviatilis, syn. Blechnum fluviatile, or ray water fern
 Histiopteris incisa
 Lomaria nuda, syn. Blechnum nudum, or fishbone water fern
 Oceaniopteris cartilaginea, syn. Blechnum cartilagineum, or soft water fern
 Osmunda regalis
 Parablechnum wattsii, syn. Blechnum wattsii, or hard water fern
 Regnellidium diphyllum, or two-leaf water fern
 Salvinia molesta, or giant water fern
 Telmatoblechnum indicum, syn. Blechnum indicum, or swamp water fern